Annals of the Institute of Statistical Mathematics (AISM) is a bimonthly peer-reviewed scientific journal covering statistics. It was established in 1949 and is published by Springer Science+Business Media on behalf of Institute of Statistical Mathematics. The editor-in-chief is Yoshiyuki Ninomiya (Institute of Statistical Mathematics). According to the Journal Citation Reports, the journal has a 2020 impact factor of 1.267.

References

External links 
 
 Journal Office (delayed open access)

Statistics journals
Publications established in 1949
Bimonthly journals
Springer Science+Business Media academic journals
English-language journals